Server Qurtseit Trupçu ( – 17 April 1938) was a Soviet Crimean Tatar politician who served as Secretary of the Crimean Regional Committee of the All-Union Communist Party (Bolshevik) and a NKVD troika for a few months in 1937 before he was arrested and executed as part of the Great Purge.

Biography 

Server Qurtseit Trupçu was born around 1908, in the Crimean village of Dereköy (now ). From 1919 to 1924, he worked as a labourer, including as a cattle herder and orphanage worker around the Yalta area. In 1924, he joined the Komsomol.

From 1926 to 1927, Trupçu worked as an instructor and organiser of the Komsomol district committee in Yalta. In 1928, he joined the All-Union Communist Party (Bolshevik). Afterwards, he continued to work as an instructor and organiser of the Komsomol, but moved to the cities of Sevastopol and Simferopol.

In 1931, Trupçu was placed in charge of the Personnel Department of the Crimean Regional Committee. From 1932 to 1934, he studied at the Institute of Red Professors in Moscow, and then taught at the institute for three years.

In 1937, Trupçu was chosen as Secretary of the Crimean Regional Committee. In this time, he was also part of an NKVD troika, and an active participant in the Great Purge, as well as the advancement of Crimean culture (for example, the Crimean State Opera and Ballet Theatre).

In September 1937, however, Trupçu was removed from office. Two months later, he was arrested. On 5 March 1938, he was sentenced to death by the Military Collegium of the Supreme Court of the Soviet Union. On 17 April 1938, he was executed in Simferopol.

On 22 March 1958, he was rehabilitated due to a lack of corpus delicti.

Family 

References 

1908 births
1938 deaths
Crimean Tatar people executed by the Soviet Union
Crimean Tatar politicians
Great Purge victims from Russia
Great Purge victims from Ukraine
NKVD troika
Soviet rehabilitations